San Francisco Javier is a municipality in the Usulután department of El Salvador.

Municipalities of the Usulután Department